Lucius Julius Ursus Servianus (45 – 136 AD) was an Iberian Roman politician. He was a prominent public figure in the reigns of Roman emperors Nerva, Trajan and Hadrian. He was the last private citizen to receive a third consulship; such honors came to be reserved for members of the emperor's family.

According to an inscription found, his full name is Gaius Julius Servilius Ursus Servianus, however, in the Augustan History, he is known as Lucius Julius Ursus Servianus.

Life 
Little is known about his origins. Ronald Syme has argued that he was originally named Servius Julius Servianus, suffect consul in 90, and that Lucius Julius Ursus adopted him after that year, leading to a name change; no scholar has spoken against this identification, and it has been considered accepted by all.  Before the accession of Trajan in 98, Servianus had married Aelia Domitia Paulina, the elder sister of Hadrian, who was thirty years younger than he was. During Trajan's reign (98-117), Paulina and Servianus had a daughter called Julia Serviana Paulina. 

When Nerva died on January 27 of the year 98, Hadrian travelled to Germany to find Trajan, to announce the death of Nerva. Servianus tried unsuccessfully to stop Hadrian's travel to Germany, because he was jealous of the favor shown Hadrian by Trajan. However, Servianus and Hadrian reconciled and were for a long time on good terms.

Servianus served twice as consul under Trajan, and once as consul under Hadrian in 134. As a senator he was a very influential and powerful man. Trajan appointed him governor of Germania Inferior for 97 to 99, and immediately afterwards made him governor of Pannonia for 99 to 100, granting him important military commands against Dacia. 

Servianus was a friend to the Senator and historian Pliny the Younger; two of Pliny's surviving letters are addressed to him, and Pliny mentions him in two more. Through Servianus' influence, Trajan granted Pliny immunities only usually granted to a father of three, the jus trium liberorum. Before Pliny's death around 111, Servianus and Paulina had arranged and married their daughter Julia to Gnaeus Pedanius Fuscus Salinator, ordinary consul in 118 as the colleague of emperor Hadrian. Pliny the Younger sent him and his wife a letter of congratulations about their daughter's wedding.

When Trajan died on August 8, 117, his cousin and adopted son Hadrian became emperor. As Emperor, Hadrian treated Servianus with distinguished honor, considering him to be his first successor. When Paulina died in 130, Hadrian and Servianus shared a private ceremony for her.
 
For a long time, the emperor Hadrian had considered Servianus as his unofficial successor. As Hadrian's reign drew to a close, however, he changed his mind. Although the emperor certainly thought Servianus capable of ruling as an emperor after Hadrian's own death, Servianus, by now in his nineties, was clearly too old for the position. Hadrian's attentions turned to Servianus' grandson, who was also named Lucius Pedanius Fuscus Salinator. Hadrian promoted the young Salinator, his great-nephew, gave him special status in his court, and groomed him as his heir. Servianus, who always cherished the idea that his youthful grandson would one day succeed his brother-in-law, was overjoyed.

However, in 136, Hadrian changed his mind and decided to adopt Lucius Aelius Caesar as his son and heir. Servianus and the younger Salinator were angry with Hadrian and wanted to challenge him over the adoption. 
It is possible Salinator went so far as to attempt a coup against Hadrian in which Servianus was implicated. In order to avoid any potential conflict in the succession, Hadrian ordered the deaths of Salinator and Servianus. Ironically, Aelius died before Hadrian in 138, forcing Hadrian to adopt Antoninus Pius.

Sources 
 Augustan History - Hadrian
 https://web.archive.org/web/20070125184755/http://www.ancientlibrary.com/smith-bio/3125.html
 http://www.fofweb.com/Onfiles/Ancient/AncientDetail.asp?iPin=ROME1573
 http://www.newadvent.org/cathen/07104b.htm

References

45 births
136 deaths
1st-century Romans
2nd-century Romans
Imperial Roman consuls
Roman governors of Pannonia
Roman governors of Germania Inferior
Executed ancient Roman people
People executed by the Roman Empire
2nd-century executions
Executed Spanish people
Ursus Servianus, Lucius
Julius Ursus Servianus, Lucius
Nerva–Antonine dynasty
Ancient Roman adoptees